Days of Our Lives is the second studio album by German pop group Bro'Sis. It was released on May 13, 2003, by Cheyenne Records, Polydor and Zeitgeist. It was primarily produced by Thorsten Brötzmann, with additional production from Peter Ries, Marc Mozart, Ken & Jon, and others. The album reached the top ten in Germany. Days of our Lives spawned two singles, including double A-single "Oh No"/"Never Stop" and a single remix of "V.I.P.", the band's first release without original bandmate Indira Weis.

Track listing

Charts

References

2003 albums
Bro'Sis albums
Polydor Records albums